The 2015 FIA Junior World Rally Championship was the fourteenth season of the Junior World Rally Championship, an auto racing championship recognized by the Fédération Internationale de l'Automobile, running in support of the World Rally Championship.

The Junior World Rally Championship was open to drivers under the age of twenty-eight. All teams contested six nominated European events, out of seven rounds, with all of their scores counting towards their final championship position. The drivers competed in identical Citroën DS3 R3Ts with the 2014 homologated MAX Kit, using Michelin tyres. The winner received a programme of six rallies in Europe in a Citroën DS3 R5, competing in the 2016 FIA WRC2 championship.

Calendar

The final 2015 Junior World Rally Championship calendar consisted of seven European events (up from the six used in 2014), taken from the 2015 World Rally Championship.

Calendar changes

 The total number of events will be seven, one higher than in 2014. Drivers still will only be able to compete on six events.
 Rallye Deutschland was dropped in favour of the Monte Carlo Rally and the Rally de Catalunya.

Rule changes

 The identical Citroën DS3 R3T provided by Citroën Racing, will be equipped with a MAX Kit that was homologated in 2014.
 With the calendar elevated to seven events (up from the six of the 2014 season), drivers will have to nominate six events in which they will be able to score points.
 The winner will receive a programme of six rallies in Europe in a Citroën DS3 R5, competing in the 2016 FIA WRC2 championship.

Entries

The following drivers competed in the championship.

Rally summaries

Results and standings

Points are awarded to the top ten classified finishers.

FIA Junior World Rally Championship for Drivers

FIA Junior World Rally Championship for Co-Drivers

FIA Junior World Rally Championship for Nations

References

External links
Official website of the World Rally Championship
Official website of the Fédération Internationale de l'Automobile
Season at ewrc-results.com

2015 in rallying